Megachile nigripollex is a species of bee in the family Megachilidae. It was described by Vachal in 1910.

References

Nigripollex
Insects described in 1910